Nathaniel Bullock (May 1, 1777 – November 13, 1867) was a lawyer, lieutenant governor,  of Rhode Island, and Speaker of the Rhode Island House of Representatives.

Bullock was born to Samuel Bullock (1737-1821) and Silence (Bowen) Bullock (1744-1825) and was part of a prominent extended family in New England. Johnathan Russell Bullock was his son. He graduated from Brown University in 1798.

Bullock ran for governor in 1839, placing second in an election where no candidate received a majority and the office was filled in an acting capacity by Samuel Ward King. He served as Rhode Island's lieutenant governor in 1842 and 1843.

The Library of Congress has a campaign broadside including him on the Democratic Republican and "Farmers' Prox." 1840 ticket.

He was involved with Freeman's Bank and the construction of its bank building in Bristol.

References

1777 births
1867 deaths
Brown University alumni
Rhode Island lawyers
Lieutenant Governors of Rhode Island
Rhode Island Democratic-Republicans
Rhode Island Democrats
19th-century American lawyers
19th-century American politicians